Kregel is a surname. Notable people with the surname include:

Jan Kregel (born 1944), post-Keynesian economist
Kevin R. Kregel (born 1956), American astronaut
Marinus Kregel (1911–1996), American football and college basketball coach

See also 
Kregel Publications, Evangelical Christian book publisher based in Grand Rapids, Michigan
Kregel Windmill Museum, Agriculture museums in the United States